Anne Boyer (born 1973) is an American poet and essayist. She is the author of The Romance of Happy Workers (2008), The 2000s (2009), My Common Heart (2011), Garments Against Women (2015), and The Handbook of Disappointed Fate (2018).  In 2016, she was a featured blogger at the Poetry Foundation, where she wrote an ongoing series of posts about her diagnosis and treatment for a highly aggressive form of breast cancer, as well as the lives and near deaths of poets. Her essays about illness have appeared in Guernica, The New Inquiry, Fullstop, and more. Boyer teaches at the Kansas City Art Institute with the poets Cyrus Console and Jordan Stempleman. Her poetry has been translated into numerous languages including Icelandic, Spanish, Persian, and Swedish. With Guillermo Parra and Cassandra Gillig, she has translated the work of 20th century Venezuelan poets Victor Valera Mora, Miguel James, and Miyo Vestrini.

In 2020, Boyer was awarded the Pulitzer Prize for General Nonfiction for her book The Undying: Pain, Vulnerability, Mortality, Medicine, Art, Time, Dreams, Data, Exhaustion, Cancer, and Care.

Life and career 
Anne Boyer was born in Topeka, Kansas in 1973 and grew up in Salina, Kansas where she was educated in its public schools and libraries; and she received an MFA in creative writing from Wichita State University. She has been a professor at the Kansas City Art Institute since 2011. Her diagnosis and treatment of breast cancer has become the subject of her current work, examining the intersection of social class and medical care.

Boyer is the winner of the 2018 Cy Twombly Award in Poetry from the Foundation for Contemporary Arts, and her book Garments Against Women won the 2016 Community of Literary Magazines and Presses Firecracker Award in poetry. She was also named "The Best Writer in Kansas City" by The Pitch.  In 2018, she also won the Whiting Award in Nonfiction/Poetry.

In March 2020, Boyer was awarded the Windham-Campbell Literature Prize.

Critical reception 
Boyer's 2015 book Garments Against Women spent six months at the top of the Small Press Distribution's best seller list in poetry. The New York Times called it "a sad, beautiful, passionate book that registers the political economy of life and literature itself."

Chris Stroffolino at The Rumpus described it as "widening the boundaries of poetry and memoir."

Garments Against Women was described by Publishers Weekly as a book that "faces the material and philosophical problems of writing—and by extension, living—in the contemporary world. Boyer attempts to abandon literature in the same moments that she forms it, turning to sources as diverse as Jean-Jacques Rousseau, the acts of sewing and garment production, and a book on happiness that she finds in a thrift store. Her book, then, becomes filled with other books, imagined and resisted."

The Undying: Pain, Vulnerability, Mortality, Medicine, Art, Time, Dreams, Data, Exhaustion, Cancer, and Care tied for winner of the 2020 Pulitzer Prize for General Nonfiction

List of works 
 A Handbook of Disappointed Fate
 Garments Against Women
 The Undying
 My Common Heart
 Art is War
 Anne Boyer's Good Apocalypse
 The Romance of Happy Workers
 A Form of Sabotage
 The 2000s

Bibliography 
 The Romance of Happy Workers. Minneapolis, Minnesota: Coffee House Press, 2008. 
 Garments Against Women. Boise, Idaho: Ahsahta Press, 2015. 
A Handbook of Disappointed Fate. Brooklyn, New York: Ugly Duckling Presse, 2018. 
The Undying: Pain, vulnerability, mortality, medicine, art, time, dreams, data, exhaustion, cancer, and care. New York, New York: Farrar, Straus and Giroux, 2019.

References 

American women poets
1973 births
Living people
Writers from Topeka, Kansas
Poets from Kansas
21st-century American poets
21st-century American women writers
21st-century American translators
People from Salina, Kansas
Wichita State University alumni
Kansas City Art Institute faculty
Pulitzer Prize for General Non-Fiction winners
American women academics